Doctor Love or Dr. Love may refer to:

Music
 Doctor Love (album), by Alex Gaudino, 2013
 "Doctor Love", a song by Bananarama from Deep Sea Skiving, 1983
 "Doctor Love", a song by First Choice, 1977
 "Doctor Love", a song by the Pearls, 1975
 "Doctor Love", a song by Split Enz from See Ya 'Round, 1984
 "Dr Love", a 1976 song by Tina Charles
 "Dr. Love" (song), by Stella Getz, 1994
 "Dr. Love", a song by the Bumblebeez, 2007
 "Calling Dr. Love", a song by Kiss, 1977

People
 Dr. Love (artist) (born 1985), Georgian street/graffiti artist
 Leo Buscaglia (1924–1998), American academic, author, and motivational speaker
 Paul Matavire (1961–2005), Zimbabwean musician in the Jairos Jiri Band

Other uses
 Doctor Love (film), a 2011 Indian Malayalam film
 Doctor Love, a novel by Gael Greene
 "Doctor Love", a poem by Patti Smith from the 1978 book Babel